Donetsk Sergei Prokofiev International Airport (Russian: Международный аэропорт "Донецк")  is a former airport located  northwest of Donetsk, Ukraine, that was destroyed in 2014 during the war in Donbas. It was built in the 1940s, rebuilt in 1973, and then again from 2011 to 2012 for Euro 2012. In 2013, during its last full year of operation, it handled more than a million passengers. 

The airport is named after twentieth-century composer Sergei Prokofiev, who was a native of Donetsk Oblast. The former airport, after being destroyed during the 1st and 2nd Battles of Donetsk Airport, has been controlled by pro-Russian separatist forces since 2015 and has occasionally since been a  battleground.

History

Development until 2014

In accordance with a large infrastructure-building program in the Donetsk area for Euro 2012, in 2011 the Ukrainian construction company "Altcom" constructed a new airport terminal, developed by experts from Croatia. The Ukrainian state budget allocated $758m for the renovation project, while private investments and the local budget of Donetsk Oblast made up the remaining funds. During Euro 2012, the new terminal received international flights, with soccer fans flown in from many European capitals, including London, and was regarded as a symbol of Ukraine’s progress. From August 1, 2012 it served both domestic and international flights.

The airline Donbassaero had its head office located at the airport, although ceased operations in January 2013.

2014–15 conflict

On May 26, 2014, fighters from the Donetsk People's Republic, with technical assistance from Russian mercenaries, seized the airport soon after Petro Poroshenko won the 2014 Ukrainian presidential election. In response, Ukrainian forces launched air attacks to regain control of it from the belligerents. Two civilians and 38 combatants were reported dead, and the Ukrainian military regained control of the airport. Service at the airport has not resumed since the battle.

On October 1, 2014, the belligerents attempted to retake the airport. A spokesman for what the Ukrainian government calls its anti-terrorist operation said Ukrainian forces repelled four attacks on the airport that evening. A T-64 tank was destroyed and seven Donetsk fighters were killed, Vladyslav Seleznyov told Kanal 5 TV. A reporter for Associated Press in Donetsk said on October 1 that there were indications that the government had lost control of the airport. DNR leader Alexander Zakharchenko said it was "95%" under his forces’ control. Ukrainian officials insisted the airport was still under government control as of October 2014.

Zakharchenko claimed that the rebels had taken complete control of the airport on January 17, 2015, after a series of battles with pro-government forces over the complex. One day later, it was reported that government forces claimed to have retaken almost all parts of the airport lost to the belligerents in recent weeks, after a mass operation during the night. On January 21, Ukrainian forces admitted losing control of the airport to the Donetsk People's Republic rebels.

Over the course of battles for the airport, the airport complex suffered extensive damage from constant bombardments and change of hand between pro-government and proxy forces. The main terminal buildings, with their sturdy concrete construction, served as garrisons and shelters for soldiers defending the airport grounds, and as a result the buildings were subjected to attacks and suffered extensive structural failures, most notably the collapse of the massive roof over the new terminal building's mezzanine. Similarly, the control tower was contested by opposing forces as a strategic lookout point, but eventually collapsed in January 2015 during the final leg of the Second Battle of Donetsk Airport.

Since the fighting, the ruins of the airport have been cleared of rubble, leaving behind the concrete shells of the new terminal building and adjoining parking garage.

Airlines and destinations
All civilian airline operations including Lufthansa, LOT Polish Airlines, Air Berlin, Aeroflot and flydubai were suspended due to armed conflict in May 2014, and the airport's facilities were subsequently completely destroyed.

Statistics

Accidents and incidents
 On November 3, 1996, a group of contract killers dressed in security forces fatigues opened indiscriminate fire at the plane of prominent local businessman Yevhen Shcherban as he disembarked on the apron after a flight from Moscow. Shcherban and his wife were killed, together with an airport ground technician and the plane's flight engineer.
 On February 13, 2013, South Airlines Flight 8971 crashed when the plane overshot the runway as it attempted an emergency landing, resulting in 5 fatalities.

See also
 Luhansk International Airport
 List of airports in Ukraine
 List of the busiest airports in Ukraine

References

External links

 Official website
 

1940s establishments in Ukraine
2014 disestablishments in Ukraine
Airports built in the Soviet Union
Defunct airports in Ukraine
Companies based in Donetsk
Buildings and structures in Donetsk
Ruins in Ukraine